Dawson Dawson-Walker (20 December 1868 – 28 January 1934) was a British Church of England clergyman, classicist, theologian and academic. From 1911 to 1919, he was Principal of St John's College, Durham. From 1919 to his death in 1934, he was Van Mildert Professor of Divinity at Durham University and a Canon Residentiary of Durham Cathedral.

Early life and education
Dawson-Walker was born on 20 December 1868 to Richard Felvus Walker. His family were Wesleyan Methodists and he was brought up in this denomination of Christianity. He was educated at Bradford Grammar School, a private school in Bradford, Yorkshire. Having been awarded a scholarship, he studied classics at Corpus Christi College, Oxford. He was awarded a first class in the Honour Moderations in 1889 and a second class in Literae Humaniores in 1891. He therefore graduated from the University of Oxford with a Bachelor of Arts (BA) degree in 1891. It was during his degree, that he moved from Methodism to Anglicanism.

In 1901, he completed a Bachelor of Divinity (BD) degree from Oxford. In 1905, he completed a Doctor of Divinity (DD) degree from Oxford and was awarded a DD ad eundem by Durham University.

Career
In 1894, Dawson-Walker was ordained in the Church of England at Ripon Cathedral by William Boyd Carpenter, Bishop of Ripon. He served his curacy at Bradford Parish Church in Bradford, Yorkshire. He then joined Durham University as a lecturer in classics. In 1898, he was appointed a tutor in theology. In 1901, he became a chaplain at County Hospital, Durham and censor of St Cuthbert's Society, Durham. In 1909, he was appointed Examining Chaplain for ordination candidates in the Diocese of Durham.

From 1910 to 1919, he was Professor of Biblical Exegesis at Durham University. From 1911 to 1919, he was additionally Principal of St John's College, Durham. In 1918, he became chaplain to the Corporation of Durham. He maintained a personal interest in the development of his students during and after his time as principal.

In 1919, he was appointed Van Mildert Professor of Divinity at Durham University and a Canon Residentiary of Durham Cathedral. These two appointments and his chaplaincy of the Corporation of Durham, meant that he crossed community boundaries and connected town, gown and the clergy.

Personal life
Dawson-Walker fell within the Evangelical tradition of the Anglican church.

In 1899, he married Mary Maud Jane Featherston. Together, they had three sons.

Selected works

References

 
 
 

1868 births
1934 deaths
19th-century English Anglican priests
20th-century English Anglican priests
British classical scholars
20th-century English theologians
Evangelical Anglican theologians
People educated at Bradford Grammar School
Clergy from Bradford
Academics of Durham University
Converts to Anglicanism from Methodism
Principals of St John's College, Durham